King of the Castle may refer to:

 King of the Castle (TV series), a British children's television serial
 King of the Castle (1926 film), a British silent drama film
 King of the Castle (1936 film), a British comedy film
 King of the Hill (game), a children's game, also known as King of the Castle